Sir Mohamed Muktar Jama Farah   (born Hussein Abdi Kahin; 23 March 1983) is a British long-distance runner. His ten global championship gold medals (four Olympic and six World titles) make him the most successful male track distance runner ever, and he is the most successful British track athlete in modern Olympic Games history.

Farah is the 2012 and 2016 Olympic gold medallist in both the 5,000 m and 10,000 m. He is the second athlete, after Lasse Virén, to win both the 5,000 m and 10,000 m titles at successive Olympic Games. He also completed the 'distance double' at the 2013 and 2015 World Championships in Athletics. He was the first man to defend both distance titles in both major global competitions; a feat described as the 'quadruple-double'. After finishing second in the 10,000 metres at the 2011 World Championships, Farah had an unbroken streak of ten global final wins (the 5,000m in 2011, the double in 2012, 2013, 2015 and 2016, and the 10,000m in 2017). The streak ended in Farah's final championship track race, when he finished second to Ethiopia's Muktar Edris in the 2017 5,000 metres final. 

On the track, Farah mostly competed over 5,000 metres and 10,000 metres, but has run competitively from 1,500 metres to the marathon. In 2017, he indicated his intention to switch wholly to road racing following victory at his final track race, the 2017 IAAF Diamond League 5,000 metres final. He won the 2018 Chicago Marathon in a time of 2:05:11, a European record.  His running style has been described as bouncy and tactical, which he has attempted to alter for a more efficient and energy-saving stride pattern, especially in the longer distances. Farah runs distance races tactically, a style which is aided by his quick sprint finish.

Born in present-day Somaliland, the then Hussein Abdi Kahin was trafficked from Djibouti to London under the name of another child, Mohamed Farah, at the age of nine where he was forced into child labour. He adopted the name as his own thereafter, becoming a British citizen. He ran for Newham and Essex Beagles athletics club, training at St Mary's University College, Twickenham from 2001 to 2011. Farah is the European record holder for the 10,000 m, half marathon, marathon, and two miles, the British record holder for the 5,000 m, the British indoor record holder for the 3,000 m and the current world record holder for the one hour run and indoor world record holder for the two miles.

Farah was the first British athlete to win two gold medals at the same world championships. His five gold medals at the European Athletics Championships make him the most successful athlete in individual events in the championships' history. He has won the European Athlete of the Year award and the British Athletics Writers Association British Athlete of the Year award more than any other athlete, three times and six times respectively. In 2017, Farah won the BBC Sports Personality of the Year. Farah was appointed Commander of the Order of the British Empire (CBE) in 2013 and was knighted by Queen Elizabeth II in the 2017 New Year Honours for services to athletics.

Early life and education
Hussein Abdi Kahin was born on 23 March 1983 in Somaliland (then fully integrated within Somalia). His father died in the civil war when he was aged four, and he then became separated from his mother. He spent a few years in Mogadishu as a child. At the age of nine he was illegally trafficked to the United Kingdom via Djibouti, when he was given the name Mohammed Farah and was forced to work as a domestic servant. He was flown from the country by a woman he had never met, and made to look after another family's children. He obtained British citizenship in July 2000 under the name Mohamed Farah. These aspects of his background were not made public until July 2022, and a barrister told him that there was a risk that he might lose his British nationality as it was obtained by misrepresentations; the Home Office, however, assured him that he would not face any repercussions.

For the first years he was in Britain, he was not allowed to go to school, but when he was 11 or 12 he began to attend Year 7 at Feltham Community College, where staff were told he was a refugee from Somalia. His athletic talent was first identified by physical education teacher Alan Watkinson. Farah's ambition was to become a car mechanic or play as a right winger for Arsenal football club.

Sporting career

Early years
Farah joined the Borough of Hounslow Athletics Club in west London. He represented Hounslow at cross-country in the 1994 London Youth Games as an under-13. In 1996, at the age of 13, he entered the English schools cross-country championships and finished ninth. The following year he won the first of five English school titles. Recognising his talent, athletics philanthropist Eddie Kulukundis paid the legal fees to complete Farah's naturalisation as a British citizen, allowing him to travel to competitions without visa issues.

Farah's first major title was in the 5000 metres at the 2001 European Athletics Junior Championships, the same year that he began training at St Mary's University, Twickenham. That year, Farah became one of the first two athletes in the newly formed Endurance Performance Centre at St Mary's. He lived and trained at the college, and took some modules in an access course before becoming a full-time athlete as his career progressed.

2005–2008: First titles and personal bests

In 2005, Farah moved in with Australian Craig Mottram and a group of Kenyan runners that included 10,000 m world number one Micah Kogo. "They sleep, eat, train and rest, that's all they do but as an athlete you have to do all those things. Running with Craig made me feel more positive," Farah said. "If I ever want to be as good as these athletes I've got to work harder. I don't just want to be British number one, I want to be up there with the best."

In July 2006, Farah recorded a time of 13 minutes 9.40 seconds for 5000 m to become Britain's second-fastest runner after Dave Moorcroft. A month later, Farah won the silver medal in the European Championship 5000m in Gothenburg. Coaches Alan Storey and Mark Rowland made sure that Farah remained competitive and a few words from Paula Radcliffe before the 5000 m final inspired Farah. He has stated that: "She said to me, 'Go out and be brave. Just believe in yourself'." In December 2006, Farah won the 2006 European Cross Country Championships in San Giorgio su Legnano, Italy.

During the 2007 European Indoor Championship Farah fell and amid confusion started running in the wrong direction. Farah represented the UK at 5000 m in the 2007 World Championships in Osaka, Japan. Farah finished sixth in a time of 13:47.54.

In May 2008, Farah ran 10,000 m events, which was the fastest UK men's time for almost eight years. However, he was knocked out before the 5000 m final at the 2008 Olympics in Beijing.

2009–2010: British records and European champion
In January 2009, Farah set a new British indoor record in the 3000 metres, breaking John Mayock's record with a time of 7 minutes 40.99 seconds in Glasgow. A few weeks later, he broke his own record by more than six seconds with a time of 7 minutes 34.47 at the UK Indoor Grand Prix in Birmingham, a performance which commentator Steve Cram called "the best performance by a male British distance runner for a generation". Farah attributed his good form to a spell of winter training at altitude in Ethiopia and Kenya. In March 2009 he took gold in the 3000 m at the European Indoor Championships in Turin, recording a time of 7 minutes 40.17.

Farah competed at the 2009 World Championships in Athletics: he was in the leading pack early on in the 5000 metres race and eventually finished seventh – the best by a European runner. After the championships, he scored a victory in his first road competition over 10 miles, winning the Great South Run in 46:25 to become the third fastest Briton in spite of strong winds.

Farah was one of the favourites to upset Serhiy Lebid's dominance at the 2009 European Cross Country Championships. However, Lebid was never in contention as Farah and Alemayehu Bezabeh were some distance ahead throughout the run. Farah was overtaken by Bezabeh in the latter stages of the race, leaving the Briton with a second consecutive silver medal at the competition. He did not manage to attend the medal ceremony, however, as he collapsed immediately after the race and needed medical attention. After a close third place behind Edwin Soi at the BOclassic, Farah competed in the short course race at the Great Edinburgh Cross Country. He was the favourite to win and surged ahead to build a comfortable lead. However, he appeared tired in the latter stages and finished third behind British runners Ricky Stevenson and Steve Vernon. Farah again required post-race medical attention and subsequent tests revealed he had low levels of iron and magnesium. He was prescribed supplements for the condition and his high altitude training plans in Kenya were unaffected.

Farah won the 2010 London 10,000 in late May in a time of 27:44, in the process beating 10K world record holder Micah Kogo. His success continued the following week at the European Cup 10,000 m. There, he improved his track best by nearly 16 seconds, finishing in a time of 27:28.86. Farah won by a margin of over forty seconds ahead of second placed Abdellatif Meftah. After training in Africa, he returned to Europe for the 2010 European Athletics Championships. He took the 10,000 metres gold medal, overtaking Ayad Lamdassem with two laps to go and finishing the race unpressured in a time of 28:24.99. This was Farah's first major title and also the first European gold medal in the event for Great Britain. He then went on to win the 5000 m, beating Jesús España and becoming only the fifth man in the 66-year history of the European Championships to achieve the 5000 m/10,000 m double, and the first for 20 years, following in the footsteps of the Czech Emil Zátopek in 1950, Zdzislaw Krzyszkowiak of Poland in 1958, Finland's Juha Vaatainen in 1971 and Salvatore Antibo, of Italy, in 1990.

On 19 August 2010, at a Diamond League meeting in Zürich, Farah ran 5000 m in 12:57.94, breaking David Moorcroft's long-standing British record and becoming the first ever British athlete to run under 13 minutes.

In December 2010, Farah was named track-and-field athlete of the year by the British Olympic Association. He closed the year at the BO classic and just missed out on the 10,000 m title, losing to Imane Merga in a sprint finish by 0.2 seconds.

2011-12: European and British records, and world medals

2011 was a successful year for Farah, beginning on 8 January at the Edinburgh Cross Country, where he defeated the top four finishers of that year's European Championships to take victory in the long race.

In February 2011, Farah announced that he would be relocating to Portland, Oregon to work with new coach Alberto Salazar, train alongside Galen Rupp, and avoid the attention of the British tabloids. On 19 February 2011 in Birmingham, England, Farah broke the European 5000 m indoor record with a time of 13:10.60, at the same time taking ten seconds off the 29-year-old British indoor record of Nick Rose. On 5 March 2011, he won gold in the 3000 metres at the European Indoor Championships. On 20 March, Farah also won the NYC Half Marathon in a time of 1:00:23, a new British record. He and training partner Galen Rupp had originally planned on running a 10,000 m race in New Zealand. However, after the race was cancelled due to the Christchurch earthquake and damage done to the track, they entered the half-marathon in New York.

On 3 June 2011, at a Diamond League meeting in Eugene, Oregon, Farah won the Prefontaine Classic's 10,000 m event in 26:46.57, setting a new British and European record. On 22 July 2011, at a Diamond League meeting in Monaco, he set a new British national record in the 5000 m with a time of 12:53.11. Farah edged out American Bernard Lagat to win the race.

In the 2011 World Championships in Athletics in Daegu, South Korea, Farah made a major breakthrough on the world stage by taking the silver medal in the 10,000 m and then the gold in the 5000 m. He became the first British man to win a World Championships medal over either distance. Farah had in fact been more strongly favoured to take the 10,000 m title, but was narrowly beaten in a last lap sprint by Ethiopian Ibrahim Jeilan. In the 5000 m, he overcame Lagat, beating him into second place. Following the race, Dave Moorcroft, former 5000 metres world record holder, hailed Farah as "the greatest male distance runner that Britain has ever seen".

At the European Championships in June 2012, he won the 5000m. This then made Farah the first athlete to win this European title more than once.

2012: Double Olympic champion

At the London 2012 Olympics, on 4 August, Farah won the 10,000 m gold in a time of 27:30.42. This was Great Britain's first Olympic gold medal in the 10,000 m, and came after two other gold medals for the country in the same athletics session. His training partner, Galen Rupp of the United States, took second place. At the time both runners were a part of the Nike Oregon Project coached by Alberto Salazar. Farah stated that he would observe his Ramadan fast later in the year. On 11 August 2012, Farah made it a long-distance double, winning the 5000 metres in a time of 13:41.66. The noise from the crowd in the 5,000 m race was so loud it made the camera shake and distorted the photo-finish image. He dedicated the two golds to his twin daughters.

On 23 August 2012, Farah returned to the track at a Diamond League meet in Birmingham, where he capped off a winning season with another victory over a distance of two miles.

CBE

Following his 2012 successes, Farah was appointed Commander of the Order of the British Empire (CBE) in the 2013 New Year Honours for services to athletics. The move was met with anger by many in the general public, including erstwhile Minister of Sports Gerry Sutcliffe, who felt that Farah instead deserved a higher accolade. Farah's former physical education teacher Alan Watkinson similarly indicated that he was disappointed that Farah was not knighted and that the decision "discredits the system although it's still a fantastic achievement for Mo and well deserved." However, deputy Prime Minister Nick Clegg cited Farah's Olympic double gold win in his 2013 New Year's message and 2012 Autumn conference, and David Cameron in August 2013 expressed support for a knighthood for Mo Farah.

2013: 1500 m record and world medals

On 19 July 2013, at the Herculis meeting in Monaco, Farah broke the European 1500 m record with a time of 3:28.81. The feat meant that he was the sixth fastest man ever over the distance, overtaking Steve Cram's 28-year-old British record and Fermín Cacho's 16-year-old European record. It also made Farah the seventh man, behind Saïd Aouita, Daniel Komen, Ali Saïdi-Sief, Hicham El Guerrouj, Augustine Kiprono Choge and Bernard Lagat to break both the 3:30 barrier in the 1500 metres and the 13-minute barrier in the 5000 metres, as well as the only athlete in history to run sub 3:30, sub 13-minute and sub 27-minute for 1500 metres, 5000 metres and 10,000 metres respectively. Additionally, he has a sub 1 hour run in the half-marathon.

The following month, Farah won the London Diamond League Anniversary Games' 3000 metres event in a time of seven minutes and 36.85 seconds. He twice broke the national record in the half-marathon, first on 24 February in New Orleans, then broke his own record on 15 September in the BUPA Great North Run.

On 10 August 2013, Farah stayed in front of Ibrahim Jeilan to win the 10,000 m event at the World Championships in Moscow. The victory was his fourth global title. On 16 August 2013, Farah won the 5,000 m event, in the process becoming double world and Olympic champion. After this victory, BBC commentator Brendan Foster and Sebastian Coe called Farah 'Britain's greatest ever athlete'. Farah became only the second man in history to win long-distance titles at successive editions of the Olympics and World Championships, after Kenenisa Bekele's 2008–09 feat. He was the first British athlete to win two individual gold medals at a World Championships.

In December 2013, Farah was the second favourite, behind Wimbledon tennis champion Andy Murray, to become the BBC Sports Personality of the Year. When he was asked what drove him to keep pushing back the boundaries of athletic accomplishment, he noted sprinter Usain Bolt's record breaking streak as a motivating example of what is possible for all dedicated athletes.

Farah was a finalist for the 2013 IAAF World Athlete of the year award. In preparation for his marathon debut, he also extended his training schedule to 120 miles a week.

2014: Double gold in Zürich

Farah began 2014 preparing for the year's London Marathon, his first such run. He described running the event as a longstanding ambition of his, particularly to do so in London. Farah finished in eighth place in a time of 2:08.21. This was outside Steve Jones' GB record, but set a new English national record.

Farah was due to compete at the 2014 Commonwealth Games in Glasgow. However, he withdrew due to illness from a stomach ailment and an infection caused from having a tooth removed. Farah later appeared in Zürich at the 2014 European Athletics Championships. He successfully defended his 5000 m title and won a gold in the 10,000 m, thus completing another major championship double. This made him the most successful individual in the history of the European Athletics Championships, with five titles to his name.

On 7 September 2014, Farah competed in the Great North Run, a British half marathon. He won the race with a personal best time of 1:00:00, exactly 1 hour.

2015: World and European records

On 21 February 2015, Farah broke the indoor two-mile world record at the Birmingham Indoor Grand Prix. He ran an 8:03.4 to break Kenenisa Bekele's record. On 22 March, Farah broke the European record for half marathon in Lisbon. He ran a time of 59 minutes, 32 seconds, surpassing the record set 14 years previously by Spain's Fabián Roncero. He repeated his long-distance gold medal double at the 2015 World Championships in Athletics. His win in the 10,000m made him the oldest World Championship winner in that event, at age 32.

2016: Double-Double Olympic Golds at Rio

On 26 March, Farah received a bronze medal in the 2016 IAAF World Half Marathon Championships in Cardiff, finishing in 59:59, less than one second ahead of Abayneh Ayele. On 20 February, Farah won the Glasgow Indoor Grand Prix 3000m event. On 5 June 2016, Farah broke the 34-year-old British 3000 metre record set by Moorcroft by winning the Diamond League in Birmingham, a win he dedicated to the recently deceased boxer Muhammad Ali. In July 2016 Farah set the concurrent world-leading time in the 5000m in winning the Diamond League in London. He won the 10,000m at the Diamond League in Eugene, in a time of 26:53.71 which remained the second-fastest time in the world of the year.

On 13 August, Farah won a gold medal in the 10,000 metres at the Rio Olympics, making it the first time a Briton had won three athletic gold Olympic medals. After being accidentally clipped on the back of the heel by American Galen Rupp on the tenth lap he fell, but went on to win gold with the time of 27:05.17. Rupp slowed after Farah's fall to check his condition and finished in fifth place with a time of 27:08.92. In the final lap Farah battled Paul Tanui, who took the lead with 300 metres remaining. Farah edged him out with 100 metres to go. Tanui finished in second place with a time of 27:05.64.

On 20 August, Farah went on to win a second gold medal in the 5,000 metres at the Rio Olympics. Coming into the 31st Olympiad, Farah was trying to win gold medals in the 10,000 metres and 5,000 metres to double his success from the London Olympics. Farah held off the lead he had set and finished with a time of 13:03:30, making it only the second time someone has retained the 5000m and 10,000m Olympic titles, after Lasse Virén of Finland in 1972 and 1976. In September 2016, he won the Great North Run for a record third consecutive year.

In 2016, he was the fastest person from the European continent over two middle distance events and three long-distance events; the 1500 metres, 3000 metres, 5000 metres, 10,000 metres and the half-marathon respectively. His ninth global title, the 5000m in Rio, made him surpass Kenenisa Bekele as the most frequent winner of gold in history for major long-distance events. He remained unbeaten in 2016 in the 3000m as well as in six races over the 10,000m and 5,000m distances.

2017: Tenth world title and track retirement

Farah announced that he would switch from track events to the marathon after the 2017 World Championships in Athletics. He won the 10,000m event, and came second in the 5,000m event after Ethiopia's Muktar Edris.

Farah won his final two track events, in the Diamond league, in Birmingham and Zurich. On 24 August 2017, he won his final 5,000m in the Diamond league, finishing in 13:06.05, in a final sprint against Paul Chelimo and Muktar Edris just behind in 13:06.09.

On 20 August 2017, Farah again reiterated his decision to move to the marathon full-time, and caused headlines when he announced after running his last 10,000m race on British soil at the Muller Grand Prix in Birmingham that he would never again run in a GB vest.

On 10 September 2017, Farah won the Great North Run for a record fourth consecutive time. He finished in 1:00:06, 6 seconds ahead of Jake Robertson.

On 31 October, Farah split from Alberto Salazar in order to be coached by Gary Lough, husband and former coach of Paula Radcliffe. Salazar stated that the split was mutual and he would be happy to advise Farah in the future.

Since 2018: full-time marathon runner

In March 2018, in preparation for the London Marathon, Farah won the inaugural London Big Half Marathon, his first race in six months. On 22 April 2018, Farah came third in the London Marathon in a time of 2:06:22, comfortably beating the British record of 2:07:13 set by Steve Jones in 1985. On 9 September 2018 Farah won the Great North Run for a record-extending fifth consecutive time. At the Chicago Marathon Farah claimed his inaugural gold medal in the marathon distance and in the process set a new European record of 2 hours 5 minutes and 11 seconds, an improvement by 37 seconds.

2019: planning a track return 

In February 2019, Farah announced he planned to run again in the London Big Half Marathon in March 2019. In an interview, he also stated that he is considering competing in the Tokyo Olympics in 2020, which, if confirmed, would mark his fourth Olympic games. As well as stating that this would depend on whether his wife and kids "let him", he reflected on his track retirement, saying:"I was honest and said I was done with the track but part of me missed it. I feel like I can still win medals and do as well as I have over the years."He has also confirmed that he may run in the 10,000 metres at the World Championships in Doha in late 2019, although this would depend on the result of the 2019 Big Half Marathon. This possibility was later confirmed by Neil Black, performance director of British Athletics, who has said that Farah had received financial backing from the National Lottery in anticipation for both his participation in the Championships, as well as for the Tokyo Olympics.

On 10 March 2019, Farah won his second London Big Half Marathon, and again hinted at running the 10,000m at the World Championships in October 2019. In April, Farah finished in fifth place in the 2019 London Marathon in 2:05:39.

On 8 September 2019, Farah won the 2019 Great North Run for a record sixth consecutive time in a new Personal best of 59:07.

On 29 November 2019, Farah announced via his YouTube channel, his plan to return to the track to defend his 10,000 m Olympic title at the Tokyo 2020 Olympic games. Farah stated he would put his marathon career on hold while he returned to track oriented training.

2020

On 4 September 2020, Farah set the men's all-time record for the one hour run at the 2020 Diamond League meeting in Brussels, Belgium, covering 21,330 metres (13.25 miles), breaking Haile Gebrselassie's record of 21,285 metres set at Ostrava, Czech Republic on 27 June 2007.

2021

Farah spent several weeks at altitude training in Ethiopia, before competing at the Djibouti International Half Marathon.  Farah won the race in a time of 1:03:07.  After training in Flagstaff, United States, Farah returned to the United Kingdom where, at the 2021 European 10,000m Cup in Birmingham, United Kingdom, he raced his first track 10,000m since the World Championships in 2017.  He finished in eighth place in a time of 27:50.64, this result broke his undefeated streak in the 10,000m from 2011 to 2021.  Farah later said he was dealing with a foot/ankle injury.

On 25 June 2021, Farah failed to qualify for the 2020 Tokyo Olympic Games managing to run only a 27:47.04 for the 10,000m at the Manchester Regional Arena, despite this time being a stadium record. The cut-off time for Olympic Qualification of the 10,000m stands at 27:28.00, leaving Farah 19 seconds off the pace. When asked whether this would lead to the end of his distinguished career, he said "It's a tough one.  If I can't compete with the best I'm not just going there to finish in a final. Tonight shows it's not good enough."

"Mobot"

Farah often marks victories with a celebration dance known as the "Mobot". He adopted the move following a television appearance in May 2012 opposite sports presenter Clare Balding, on the panel game show A League of Their Own. The host James Corden suggested to the panelists that they should think of a new dance to mark Farah's winning celebration, and Balding subsequently came up with the "M" gesture called "Mobot". At its inaugural demonstration, she indicated that the part of the move intended to represent the "M" in "Mo" was inspired by the dance to "YMCA", a popular song by the Village People. Corden himself then named it as the "Mobot". A robot was named "Mobot" at a university research exhibition, in honour of Farah's celebration. Farah has since used the pose as part of a charity to raise funds for his foundation. Virgin Media has promised to donate £2 for every YouTube video that is uploaded with someone doing the mobot. Farah often uses the sign-off Shabba in online postings.

Personal life

Family and interests
Farah lives in London, England. In July 2022, Farah revealed his birth identity as Hussein Abdi Kahin. When he was four years old, his father was killed by a stray mortar round, during the Isaaq genocide in the Somaliland War of Independence. Aged 8, Farah and his twin, Hassan, were sent to live with his uncle in Djibouti. Shortly after, Farah says he was brought to the UK by a woman he did not know, and told to use the name Mohamed Farah, taken from another child. Once in London, he was forced to work for her and her family, and prevented from contacting his own. Aged 12, Farah was allowed to start school and he later confided in his PE teacher, who contacted social services who arranged for Farah to be fostered by another family. His teacher later helped him apply for British citizenship. As an adult, Farah has made contact with his birth family, and his mother and two brothers live on a farm in Somaliland. Prior to these revelations, Farah had said that he had been separated from his twin Hassan aged eight when the family moved to join their father, who was working and studying in the UK; Hassan was unwell and unable to travel so stayed in Djibouti, but when his father returned the family Hassan was living with had moved and could not be found for twelve years.

In April 2010, Farah married his longtime girlfriend Tania Nell in Richmond, London. Other athletes at the wedding included Paula Radcliffe, Steve Cram, Hayley Yelling, Jo Pavey, Mustafa Mohamed and Scott Overall, who was an usher. Farah has a stepdaughter named Rihanna from this relationship. He and his wife have twin daughters called Aisha and Amani, born in August 2012. In 2015, Farah and Nell had a son called Hussein.

From 2011 to 2017, Farah lived with his family in Portland, Oregon, US so that he could train full-time with the Nike Oregon Project. At the end of 2017, he cut ties with his coach Alberto Salazar and decided to return to London. His statement said "Tania and I realised how much we have missed spending time with our friends and family  and the kids are so happy here, too. We want the kids to grow up in the UK. It's the right thing to do for my family.

Farah is a Muslim, and is an active supporter of the Muslim Writers Awards. Islam is an important part of his preparation: "I normally pray before a race, I read dua [Islamic prayers or invocations], think about how hard I've worked and just go for it." He notes that "the Qur'an says that you must work hard in whatever you do, so I work hard in training and that's got a lot to do with being successful. [It] doesn't just come overnight, you've got to train for it and believe in yourself; that's the most important thing." An RISSC publication named Farah as among the 500 most influential Muslims in the world in 2013.

Farah is also a fan of Arsenal F.C., and has trained with its first team squad. He has indicated a desire to become a fitness coach at the Emirates Stadium in Holloway once he retires so as to improve its conditioning record. In October 2013, he launched a book titled Mo Farah, Twin Ambitions: My autobiography in Canary Wharf, London.

Farah has a large following on social media. This includes roughly 1.5 million followers on Twitter, 1.1 million on Facebook and 1.1 million on Instagram. In 2013, he was the top-ranked query for a sportsperson on the search engine Microsoft UK Bing who was not a footballer.

Philanthropy

Farah is involved in various philanthropic initiatives, launching the Mo Farah Foundation after a trip to Somalia in 2011. The following year, he participated in ITV's The Cube and won £250,000 for his foundation, becoming the only person to win the top prize on the show. Along with other high-profile athletes, Farah later took part in the 2012 Olympic hunger summit at 10 Downing Street hosted by the Prime Minister, David Cameron, part of a series of international efforts which have sought to respond to the return of hunger as a high-profile global issue.

Olympic memorabilia featuring and signed by Farah has also been auctioned off to raise funds for the London Organising Committee of the Olympic and Paralympic Games (LOCOG). In 2013, he joined legislators and activists in a campaign urging Barclays Bank to repeal its decision to withdraw from the UK remittance market. Farah often used money transfer operators to send remittances to family, and some of the world's largest organisations and charities, including the UN and his own foundation, likewise paid staff and channelled funds through these services. In March 2013, Farah, singer Robbie Williams, and a number of other celebrities also urged the Chancellor, George Osborne to clamp down on global corporations that avoid paying taxes in poor countries in which they operate. He has also expressed support for research into brain tumours.

On 7 August 2017, Farah became a global ambassador for Marathon Kids. Speaking of his new role, Farah said, "I love running, and it's given me and my family so much. As a dad, I know how important it is for my children to be active, and I'm honoured to have the chance to inspire kids to run with Marathon Kids."

Endorsements, advertising and sponsorships

Farah has endorsement deals with a number of companies, including PACE Sports Management, Nike, Lucozade, Quorn, Bupa and Virgin Media. His work with Nike Inc. includes marketing of clothing and shoes. In order to preserve his earnings after taxes, Farah also applied in 2013 to have his main place of residence changed to Portland, where he spends most of the year training.

In December 2013, Farah signed a marketing deal with Quorn, part of a multimillion-pound campaign aimed at doubling the firm's sales. He led television advertisements for Quorn's vegetarian forms of protein, with the campaign scheduled to last throughout the following year.

Travel security

In 2012–2013, Farah intimated that he had been stopped a number of times by U.S. Customs officials under suspicion of being a terrorist, which he attributed to confusion between his full name "Mohamed" and a computerised check-in process. On one occasion after the 2012 Olympics, he said that he had attempted to prove his identity by showing his Olympic gold medals to customs officials, but that this was not accepted.

After U.S. President Donald Trump signed an executive order temporarily suspending the immigration of Somali-born U.S. permanent residents, Farah made a statement on his Facebook account stating that "I will have to tell my children that Daddy might not be able to come home."

In March 2018, Farah posted a video on Instagram depicting what he alleges to be racial harassment at Munich Airport.

Television

In November 2020, it was announced that Farah would take part in the twentieth series of I'm a Celebrity...Get Me Out of Here. He became the eighth celebrity to be eliminated on 2 December 2020 alongside AJ Pritchard.

In July 2022, the BBC documentary The Real Mo Farah revealed a true account of Farah's childhood. It follows Farah with his wife and son Hussein as he investigates his past, reuniting with his Somali family and the woman who raised him after he escaped domestic servitude. It received critical acclaim.

In November 2022, it was announced that Farah would take part in the Taskmaster 'New Year Treat III'. Farah won the episode.

Fancy Bears and Salazar

Fancy Bears leak

In July 2017, the Russian hacking group Fancy Bears leaked a database from International Association of Athletics Federations that reportedly showed that Farah was once recorded "atypical" values on his Athlete Biological Passport in 2016. The controversy came after it emerged that an IAAF staff member had regarded Farah's blood values as suspicious, and had written next to his name: "Likely doping; Passport suspicious: further data is required". However, Farah was cleared of wrongdoing by April 2016 after a separate leaked spreadsheet said his records had been "now flagged as normal with the last sample".

Salazar ban

In October 2019, Mo Farah's former coach Alberto Salazar and Nike Oregon Project doctor Jeffrey Stuart Brown, both received four year bans from athletics for the trafficking of testosterone, the prohibited use of L-carnitine and tampering with doping controls.

Awards and honours

Athletics

 2006 British Athletics Writers' Association Award
 2010 British Athletics Writers' Association Award
 2010 Best Senior Athlete of 2010 (UK Aviva Athletics Awards)
 2010 London Youth Games Hall of Fame
 2011 British Athletics Writers' Association Award
 2011 European Athlete of the Year
 2011 BBC Sports Personality of the Year Award, 3rd place
 2011 Athletics Weekly International Male Athlete
 2012 British Athletics Writers' Association Award
 2012 European Athlete of the Year
 2012 Laureus World Sports Award for Breakthrough of the Year, nominee
 2012 Athletics Weekly International Male Athlete
 2013 IAAF World Athlete of the Year, finalist
 2013 British Athletics Writers' Association Award
 2013 Athletics Weekly International Male Athlete
 2013 Laureus World Sports Award for Sportsman of the Year, nominee
 2013 British Olympic Association Olympic athlete of the year
 2013 AIPS Europe Sportsmen of the Year – Frank Taylor Trophy
 2013 Rodale, Inc., Running Times – Runner of the Year
 2014 Jesse Owens International Athlete Trophy, nominee
 2014 Laureus World Sports Award for Sportsman of the Year, nominee
 2014 sack race world record
 2015 World Record, 2-mile run, Birmingham
 Runners World top 50 influential individuals in running
 LetsRun.com number 1 in 2015 year-end world ranking for long-distance runners
 2015 fastest men's 10,000-metre runner
 2016 BAWA Athlete of the Year
 2016 British Athletics Supporters Club athlete of the year
 2016 Athletics Weekly International Male Athlete of the Year, ahead of Usain Bolt
 2016 Athletics Weekly British Male Athlete of the Year
 2017 Sportsman of the Year at the Lycamobile British Ethnic Diversity Sports Awards (BEDSAs)
2017 BBC Sports Personality of the Year Award, 1st place

Other

 2012: Winner of The Cube UK. Farah is to date the only person to win the top prize on the UK version of the show. 
 2013: Commander of the Most Excellent Order of the British Empire (CBE)
 2013: Premier Inn Celebrity Dad of The Year
 2013: Best at Sport award at the British Muslim Awards
 6th place, Freuds Heroes Index
 2014: World's 100 Most Powerful Arabs, Arabian Business
 2015: Clothing firm Rohan's eighth greatest Briton of all time
 2015: Evening Standard's top 25 most influential Londoners
 2016: Sports Relief highest polled sporting London hero with 27% of the vote
 2016: Nickelodeon Kids' Choice Award for Inspirational Athlete.
 2016: Fifth most powerful Black Briton, on tenth anniversary of Powerlist, African and Caribbean heritage listing
 2017: created a Knight Bachelor for services to Athletics.
 Awarded OLY post nominal title from World Olympians Association
 2023: Winner of The Taskmaster 'New Year Treat III'

National titles

 British Athletics Championships
 5000 metres: 2007, 2011
 British Indoor Athletics Championships
 3000 metres: 2007
 British 10K Championships
 10K run: 2011, 2012
 British Marathon Championships
 Marathon: 2014

Race results

All information from Association of Road Racing Statisticians

International competitions

Circuit wins

 Diamond League
 London Grand Prix: 2009 (5000 m), 2011 (3000 m), 2013 (3000 m), 2015 (3000 m)
 Herculis: 2011 (5000 m)
 Birmingham: 2011 (5000 m), 2012 (2 miles), 2013 (5000 m), 2014 (2 miles), 2016 (3000 m), 2017 (3000 m)
 Prefontaine Classic: 2011, 2015, 2016 (10,000 m)
 Athletissima: 2015 (5000 m)
 Weltklasse Zürich: 2017 (5000 m)
 Road
 Great South Run: 2009
 New York City Half Marathon: 2011
 Rock 'n’ Roll Mardi Gras Half Marathon: 2013
 Great North Run: 2014, 2015, 2016, 2017, 2018,2019
 Lisbon Half Marathon: 2015
 Cross country
 Cross de L'Acier: 2006
 Great Edinburgh International Cross Country: 2011

Personal bests

+ intermediate split in longer racea = aided road course according to IAAF rule 260.28

Biographical works

Autobiography
Twin Ambitions: My Autobiography (2013, Hodder & Stoughton)

Children's fiction
Ready Steady Mo! (with Kes Gray; illustrated by Marta Kissi) (2016, Hodder Children's Books)

Biopic
Mo Farah: No Easy Mile; a non-fictional account of Farah's journey to the Olympics

Other

 Cardiff native Sonny Double 1 released a biographical grime musical named Mo Farah in 2016.

See also

2012 Summer Olympics and Paralympics gold post boxes
5000 metres at the Olympics
10,000 metres at the Olympics
5000 metres at the World Championships in Athletics
10,000 metres at the World Championships in Athletics

References

External links

 
 
 
 

1983 births
Living people
People from Maroodi Jeex
Athletes from London
British male middle-distance runners
British male long-distance runners
British male marathon runners
British male cross country runners
English male middle-distance runners
English male long-distance runners
English male marathon runners
English male cross country runners
Somalian male middle-distance runners
Somalian male long-distance runners
Somalian male marathon runners
Somalian male cross country runners
British autobiographers
British children's writers
Olympic male long-distance runners
Olympic athletes of Great Britain
Olympic gold medallists for Great Britain
Olympic gold medalists in athletics (track and field)
Athletes (track and field) at the 2008 Summer Olympics
Athletes (track and field) at the 2012 Summer Olympics
Athletes (track and field) at the 2016 Summer Olympics
Medalists at the 2012 Summer Olympics
Medalists at the 2016 Summer Olympics
Commonwealth Games competitors for England
Athletes (track and field) at the 2006 Commonwealth Games
World Athletics Championships athletes for Great Britain
World Athletics Championships winners
World Athletics Championships medalists
European Athletics Championships winners
European Athletics Championships medalists
European Athletics Indoor Championships winners
European Cross Country Championships winners
British Athletics Championships winners
Diamond League winners
Chicago Marathon male winners
European Athlete of the Year winners
BBC Sports Personality of the Year winners
Commanders of the Order of the British Empire
Knights Bachelor
People in sports awarded knighthoods
Alumni of Feltham Community College
Naturalised citizens of the United Kingdom
English expatriate sportspeople in the United States
Somalian emigrants to the United Kingdom
Twin sportspeople
English twins
Black British sportsmen
British Muslims
English sportspeople of African descent
English people of Somali descent
I'm a Celebrity...Get Me Out of Here! (British TV series) participants